Keith M. Dobney  is a British archaeologist and academic, specialising in bioarchaeology and palaeopathology of human and animal remains. Since 2020, he has been Head of the School of Philosophical and Historical Inquiries at the University of Sydney. He previously worked at the Institute of Archaeology, the University of York, the University of Durham, the University of Aberdeen, and the University of Liverpool.

Selected works

References

Living people
Year of birth missing (living people)
Fellows of the Society of Antiquaries of London
Fellows of the Linnean Society of London
British archaeologists
Bioarchaeologists
Paleopathologists
Zooarchaeologists
Academics of the UCL Institute of Archaeology
Academics of the University of York
Academics of Durham University
Academics of the University of Aberdeen
Academics of the University of Liverpool
Academic staff of the University of Sydney